DeMarcus Covington (born March 30, 1989) is an American football coach who is the  defensive line coach for the New England Patriots of the National Football League (NFL).

Early years
Covington played collegiately at wide receiver for the NCAA Division I Football Championship Subdivision (FCS) Samford Bulldogs where he registered 62 receptions for 586 yards and two touchdowns from 2007 to 2010. He graduated from Samford in 2011.

Coaching career

College
DeMarcus began his coaching career a year after he graduated  in 2012 as defensive graduate assistant at the University of Alabama-Birmingham for the Blazers. In 2013 he went to the Southeastern Conference where he spent two seasons as a defensive graduate assistant at Ole Miss. In 2015  Covington coached the defensive line at UT Martin. This was followed by 2016 when he spent the college football  season as the co-defensive coordinator and defensive line coach at Eastern Illinois.

New England Patriots
He won his first Super Bowl title when the Patriots defeated the Los Angeles Rams in Super Bowl LIII. In 2020 he was moved to coaching the defensive line.

Personal life
Covington and wife, Natasha have two sons, Cassius and Cayman. Covington created Next Level in 2012, a non-profit football camp that serves as an outlet to the youth of his home town of Birmingham, Alabama, for a full day of football-related drills and activities.

References

External links
 New England Patriots profile

1989 births
Living people
American football wide receivers
Eastern Illinois Panthers football coaches
New England Patriots coaches
Ole Miss Rebels football coaches
Samford Bulldogs football players
UAB Blazers football coaches
UT Martin Skyhawks football coaches
Sportspeople from Birmingham, Alabama
Players of American football from Alabama
African-American coaches of American football
African-American players of American football
21st-century African-American sportspeople
20th-century African-American people